Diptychophora subazanalis is a moth in the family Crambidae. It was described by Stanisław Błeszyński in 1967. It is found in Suriname.

References

Diptychophorini
Moths described in 1967